The Zuellig Building is an office skyscraper located in the Makati Central Business District in Metro Manila, Philippines, and is one of buildings taller than 150 m in the area. It is owned by the Zuellig Group and developed by its real estate arm, Bridgebury Realty Corp.

Project team
The Zuellig Building was designed by international architectural firm Skidmore, Owings and Merrill, in cooperation with local architectural firm W.V. Coscolluela & Associates. Facade design was done by Meinhardt Hong Kong Pte. Ltd., while Structural, Mechanical & Electrical, and Fire Protection engineering & design was provided by Meinhardt Philippines.

Other consultants of the project team are Davis Langdon & Seah Philippines Inc. (LEED Sustainability Consultant); E.A Aurelio Landscape Architects (Landscape Consultant); SBLD Studio (Lighting Consultant); Hill & Associates Risk Consulting (Philippines) Inc. (Security Consultant); and Sun Asia Industries (Traffic Consultant).

The general contractor is Leighton Contractors (Philippines). The project construction team also includes Permasteelisa (Curtain Wall Installation); Design Coordinates, Inc.(Construction Project Management); and Davis Langdon & Seah Philippines, Inc. (Quantity Surveying).

The Commissioning Authority (CxA) is Forsspac.233

See also
List of tallest buildings in Metro Manila

References 

Skyscrapers in Makati
Skyscraper office buildings in Metro Manila
Skidmore, Owings & Merrill buildings
Office buildings completed in 2012
PEZA Special Economic Zones